The 2016–17 Segunda División season, also known as LaLiga 1|2|3 for sponsorship reasons, was the 86th since its establishment. The fixtures were announced on 15 July 2016.

Name
Previously named Liga Adelante, the competition was renamed LaLiga 1|2|3 ahead of the 2016–17 season, as a result of a three-year sponsorship agreement between the Liga de Fútbol Profesional and the banking group Banco Santander.

Team changes

To Segunda División
Promoted from Segunda División B
 Cádiz
 Reus
 UCAM Murcia
 Sevilla Atlético
Relegated from LaLiga
 Rayo Vallecano
 Getafe
 Levante

From Segunda División
Relegated to 2016–17 Segunda División B
 Ponferradina
 Llagostera
 Albacete
 Bilbao Athletic
Promoted to 2016–17 La Liga
 Alavés
 Leganés
 Osasuna

Stadia and locations

Personnel and sponsorship

Managerial changes

League table

Standings

Positions by round

Results

Promotion play-offs

Teams placed between 3rd and 6th position (excluding reserve teams) took part in the promotion play-offs. The first leg of the semi-finals was played on 14 and 15 June and the second leg on 17 and 18 June at home of the best positioned team. The final was also two-legged, with the first leg on 21 June and the second leg on 24 June, with the best positioned team also playing the second leg at home.

Season statistics

Top goalscorers

Zamora Trophy
The Zamora Trophy is awarded by newspaper Marca to the goalkeeper with least goals-to-games ratio. Keepers must play at least 28 games of 60 or more minutes to be eligible for the trophy.

Hat-tricks

(H) – Home ; (A) – Away

Attendances

Awards

References

External links
LFP website

 
2016-17
2
Spain